The Lotarev D-136 is a turboshaft engine from the ZMKB Progress Design Bureau. The engine powers the Mil Mi-26 "Halo" helicopter. Development of the engine had begun in about 1972.. The D-136 first flew on a production Mi-26 helicopter in 1980.

Design

The core of the engine is identical to the Lotarev D-36 turbofan from which the D-136 is derived.

Applications

Mil Mi-26

Specifications

See also

References

Bibliography

External links

 
 
 
 

1980s turboshaft engines
Ivchenko-Progress aircraft engines